A Lebanese Venezuelan is a Venezuelan citizen of Lebanese origin or descent. There is around 340,000 to 500,000 people of Lebanese ancestry.

Migration history
Lebanese immigration to Venezuela started when the first wave began to arrive to the country during 1862, in the last months of the Federal War. Once disembarked in the ports of Venezuela, they were classified by the authorities as Turks, because they had only been issued passports with that nationality. According to research, 2 the entry points were Margarita Island and Puerto Cabello. The first contingent of Lebanese settled in these ports and also in Cumaná, La Guaira and Punto Fijo, from where they spread to the interior of the country. They worked mainly in the commercial sector, helping to develop this sector in the national economy that until the moment presented little progress.

The second wave of Lebanese immigration developed after 1918. Next to the defeat of the Ottoman Empire after World War I, the French Mandate of Syria was established, with one of its subdivisions being the State of Greater Lebanon. The harsh conditions of the postwar period once again motivated the Lebanese to embark on a path similar to that of the 19th century towards the American continent, including Venezuela.

Despite the fact that the Lebanese had arrived in Venezuela on several occasions, it was not until the mid-1960s and early 1970s that immigration became more forceful, since at that time Venezuela had many employment opportunities and of good living.

The Lebanese were able to maintain their traditions and their identity already in Venezuelan territory, which they prioritize in relation to the education of young people in their community.

Religion
In religion, the majority of Lebanese-Venezuelans are Christians who belong to the Maronite Catholic Church, Roman Catholic, Eastern Orthodox and Melkite Catholic. A scant number are Muslims.

Venezuela is home of the largest Druze communities outside the Middle East, the Druze community are estimated around 60,000, and they are mostly Lebanese and Syrian.

Notable people

 Tareck El Aissami, politician who has served as Vice President of Venezuela from 4 January 2017 to 14 June 2018.
 Elias Eljuri, politician.
 Samir Bazzi, singer and TV host.
 Dad Dager, actress.
 Jorge Dager, politician.
 Elías Jaua, politician, former Vice President of Venezuela and university professor.
 Braulio Jatar Dotti, politician
 Braulio Jatar, lawyer and journalist
 Coraima Torres, actress.
 Elizabeth Ayoub, singer and actress.
 Julian Chela-Flores, astrobiologist and physicist.
 Edmundo Kabchi - businessman
 Georges David Kabchi Zakia - businessman
 Antonio Ghamra - businessman
 Nelson Mezerhane- banker, owner of Diario Las Americas of Miami, Florida
 Abelardo Raidi- journalist
 Henry Ramos Allup, politician and former president of the National Assembly
 Kauthar Mecias - philosopher
 Joanna Hausmann Jatar, comedian, writer and actress.
 Carolina Acosta-Alzuru - media studies writer, UGA professor.
 Carlos Lavaud- trader, founder of Navegantes del Magallanes baseball team.
 Alberto Salomón - founder of Navegantes del Magallanes baseball team.
 Ricardo Salomón - founder of Navegantes del Magallanes baseball team.
 Vicente Issa - founder of Navegantes del Magallanes baseball team.
 Eduardo Kalil - founder of Navegantes del Magallanes baseball team.
 Jorge Saldivia Gil - politician, engineer, architect, member of the Generation of 1928 and first secretary of the Communist Party of Venezuela
 Elias Sayegh- politician, mayor of El Hatillo Municipality

See also

 List of Lebanese people (Venezuela)
 Lebanese diaspora
 Arab Venezuelans

References

External links
 Al Jadid: Arabs making their mark in Latin America

Arab Venezuelan
Lebanese diaspora in South America
 
Venezuela